Traditional gospel music is older forms of gospel music.

 Traditional black gospel, which originated among African-Americans in the early 20th century
 Gospel blues, whose popularity peaked in the 1940s and 1950s
 Southern gospel, also known as "white gospel"
 Bluegrass gospel, religious songs out of the bluegrass folk music traditions